Round Harbour was a village with a population of 103 in 1956. It was also called Harbour Round.

See also
List of communities in Newfoundland and Labrador

Populated coastal places in Canada
Populated places in Newfoundland and Labrador